Mariano Moya (born 10 October 1963) is a Spanish water polo player. He competed at the 1984 Summer Olympics and the 1988 Summer Olympics.

See also
 Spain men's Olympic water polo team records and statistics
 List of men's Olympic water polo tournament goalkeepers

References

External links
 

1963 births
Living people
Spanish male water polo players
Water polo goalkeepers
Olympic water polo players of Spain
Water polo players at the 1984 Summer Olympics
Water polo players at the 1988 Summer Olympics
Place of birth missing (living people)
20th-century Spanish people